Lodovico Rocca (29 November 1895, Turin – 24 June 1986, Turin) was an Italian composer.

A pupil of Giacomo Orefice, his operas, written in late verismo style, met with some success in Italy but have been little performed elsewhere. They include; Morte di Frine, In Terra di Leggenda, Il Dibuk, his most successful work, Monte Ivnòr, and L'Uragano.

He was director of the Turin Conservatory from 1940 until 1966.

Sources

 The Complete Dictionary of Opera & Operetta, James Anderson, (Wings Books, 1993) ; Enciclopedia Treccani (http://www.treccani.it/enciclopedia/lodovico-rocca/)

1895 births
1986 deaths
Musicians from Turin
Italian opera composers
Male opera composers
Italian classical composers
Italian male classical composers
20th-century classical composers
20th-century Italian composers
20th-century Italian male musicians